Katsav is a Hebrew surname literally meaning Butcher. Notable people with the surname include:

Gila Katsav, Israeli public figure who was First Lady of Israel from 2000 until 2007
Guy Katsav, British record producer
Moshe Katsav, Israeli politician,  the eighth President of Israel

See also

Occupational surnames
Hebrew-language surnames